A women's college is an undergraduate, bachelor's degree-granting institution, whose student population is composed exclusively or almost exclusively of women.

Women's College may also refer to specific institutes:

 Women's College, Aligarh Muslim University, in Uttar Pradesh, India
 Women's College, Kolkata, in West Bengal, India
 Mahila Maha Vidyalaya, in Uttar Pradesh, India, also known as Women's College, Banaras Hindu University

See also
 The Women's College (disambiguation), similarly named institutes